Originally produced as Konica Minolta AF Zoom DT 18-70mm 3.5-5.6 (D) by Konica Minolta, and later produced by Sony, the Sony α DT 18-70mm 3.5-5.6 (SAL-1870), is a photographic lens compatible with cameras using the Minolta A-mount and Sony A-mount lens mounts. The DT designation means this lens is designed to be used with a camera with an APS-C size sensor. When the 1.5× crop factor is considered, the lens has an effective equivalent 27–105mm focal length.

This lens was often sold as a kit lens with the Sony DSLR-A100K, DSLR-A100W, DSLR-A200K, DSLR-A200W, DSLR-A300K, DSLR-A350W and DSLR-A700K kits. It was superseded by the SAL-1855 lens with the launch of the DSLT system in 2010.

See also
 List of Konica Minolta A-mount lenses
 List of Minolta A-mount lenses

Sources
Technical specs and user reviews on dyxum.com

External links
Sony: DT 18-70mm F3.5-5.6 Standard zoom lens

18-70
Camera lenses introduced in 2005